Jeanne Bardey (April 12, 1872 – October 13, 1954) was a French painter and sculptor who lived in Lyon.

She was born in Lyon. She is known for being the last student of Auguste Rodin. In 1916, Rodin described Jeanne Bardey as his heir, but his last wishes were not respected, and she was removed from his legacy. More than 600 of her sculptures are contained in the collections of the Museum of Fine Arts of Lyon. Other pieces are held by the Musée d'Orsay. Bardey had a daughter, Henriette.

References

Sources
 Camille Mauclair, "Madame Bardey", in Art et les Artistes, 1913. (in French)
 Roger Marx, "Peintres-graveurs contemporains : Mme Jeanne Bardey", in La Gazette des beaux-arts, 1913. (in French)
 Hubert Thiolier, Peintres lyonnais intimistes : Guiguet, Garraud, Degabriel, J. Bardey amie de Rodin, Bron, H. Thiolier, 1987. (in French)
 Hubert Thiolier, Jeanne Bardey et Rodin : Une élève passionnée; La bataille du musée Rodin, Bron, H. Thiolier, 1990, . (in French)
 André Vessot, "Jeanne Bardey, dernière élève d'Auguste Rodin", in Histoire-généalogie : Magazine web, 2011-2013. (in French)

1872 births
1954 deaths
French women painters
20th-century French sculptors
Artists from Lyon
20th-century French women artists
20th-century French painters
Sculptors from Lyon